Wild Beauty is a 1946 American action film directed by Wallace Fox and written by Adele Buffington. The film stars Don Porter, Lois Collier, Jacqueline deWit, Robert Wilcox, George Cleveland, Dick Curtis and Robert 'Buzz' Henry. The film was released on August 9, 1946, by Universal Pictures.

Plot
A pretty school teacher (Lois Collier)---make that a very pretty school teacher---, a doctor (Don Porter) who disapproves of the white man's attitude toward Indians, and a young Indian boy (Buzz Henry) do what they can in the modern west to keep Robert Wilcox and his henchies (the usual Universal suspects headed by Dick Curtis) from capturing and killing a wild horse herd so Wilcox can sell the hides. It all looks bigger than it is because director Wallace Fox makes liberal use via stock footage of the massive wild horse herds from Universal's 1936.

Cast        
Don Porter as Dr. Dave Morrow
Lois Collier as Linda Gibson
Jacqueline deWit as Cissy Cruthers
Robert Wilcox as Gordon Madison
George Cleveland as Barney Skeets
Dick Curtis as John Andrews
Robert 'Buzz' Henry as Johnny
Wild Beauty the Horse as Wild Beauty

References

External links
 

1946 films
American action films
1940s action films
Universal Pictures films
Films directed by Wallace Fox
American black-and-white films
1940s English-language films
1940s American films